Vibe Squad is a British music group formed in 2009. The group was initially set up as a quintet consisting of Kelvin Amoako, William Osei- Obengo, Richard Korede and Bright Oduro who were all students at NewVic Sixth Form College in the London Borough of Newham. Bright Oduro (alias: Rudboi) was the first to leave the group in pursuance of a career in music production. The music group Vibe Squad (V.S) emerged from the fusion of Four boys coming from West African Diaspora backgrounds with overwhelming talents after an intense talent spotting exercise. Vibe Squad was formed in London and the headquarters is still situated at the same location. Being an upcoming group, there were barricades that the V.S had to break in order to get noticed, which they did  with the help of their first hit single "Whine Pon Me".

References

External links
http://www.ghanaweb.com/GhanaHomePage/entertainment/artikel.php?ID=196470
http://www.museke.com/en/node/3812
http://modrnghanaweb.com/new-music-do-me-well-vibe-squad-129938.htm

British world music groups